Christian Langella (born 7 April 2000) is an Italian professional footballer who plays as a midfielder for Cerignola.

Club career
Having been part of Pisa youth set-up, he Langella made his debuts in Serie C on the 23 December 2017 in the 2–0 win against Olbia.

Having already been in loan with the S.S.C. Bari for the 2018–19 Serie D, he joined another side from that division the next season: the S.S.D. Palermo, where he impressed and played a central role in Palermo's ascension to Serie C.

On 4 September 2020, he moved on a new loan to Renate.

On 5 August 2021, he went on a new loan to Monopoli.

On 2 August 2022, Langella signed with Cerignola, newly promoted into Serie C.

Career statistics

Club

References

2000 births
Sportspeople from Livorno
Living people
Italian footballers
Association football midfielders
Pisa S.C. players
S.S.C. Bari players
Palermo F.C. players
A.C. Renate players
S.S. Monopoli 1966 players
S.S.D. Audace Cerignola players
Serie C players
Serie D players
Footballers from Tuscany